Crushing Love is the second studio album by Some Girls, released in 2006 (see 2006 in music).

Track listing

Personnel
Juliana Hatfield - vocals, guitars, keyboards and harmonica
Heidi Gluck - bass, vocals, lap steel, keyboards and guitar on "Live Alone"
Freda Love - drums and vocals
Jake Smith - additional guitar on "Magnetic Fields" and backing vocals on "Is This What I've Been Waiting For?"
Josh Berwanger - banjo on "On My Own Again"
Tony Whitlock - recorder on "Rock Or Pop?"

Production
Producer: Some Girls, Tony Whitlock and Andy Fry
Engineer: Tony Whitlock, Andy Fry and Vess Ruhtenberg
Mixing: Paul Q. Kolderie
Mastering: Jonathan Wyner
Design: Burton Parker for Blue Collar Press
Photography: Josh Berwanger

References

Some Girls (band) albums
2006 albums